Thottilla is a 1972 Indian Malayalam film, directed by Karmachandran and produced by P. Karmachandran. The film stars Jayabharathi and Kottarakkara Sreedharan Nair in the lead roles. The film had musical score by R. K. Shekhar.

Cast
Jayabharathi
Kottarakkara Sreedharan Nair

Soundtrack
The music was composed by R. K. Shekhar and the lyrics were written by Sreekumaran Thampi.

References

External links
 

1972 films
1970s Malayalam-language films